Slavko Sobin (born 13 November 1984 in Split) is a Croatian actor.

Biography
At 18 Sobin moved to Los Angeles to study acting at the American Academy of Dramatic Arts, where he graduated in 2007. Upon his return to Croatia, he moved to Zagreb and works as a freelance artist in several theaters: Merlin Theatre, Open University of Velika Gorica, and DK Dubrava.
In 2009 his first return to Split with the play 'Here he writes about the title of the drama Anti' in him, but now the theater GKM, and 'Fisherman fights' in the National Theatre in Split. In 2015, he played a Meereenese fighter in the Game of Thrones episode "Sons of the Harpy."

Alongside Bojana Gregorić, Sobin hosted the 2019 Croatian Theatre Awards. He provided the voice of Gideon Grey in the Croatian dub of Zootopia (2016).

Filmography

Film
 Papillon (2017) as El Caiman
 97 Minutes (TBA)

Television roles
 "Crno-bijeli svijet" as Đermano "Žungul" Kurtela (2015–2019)
 "Ruža vjetrova" as Petar Odak (2012–2013)
 "Loza" as Jerko (2011–2012)
 "Najbolje godine" as inspektor Edi Pavleković (2010–2011)
 "Dolina sunca" as Matej Zlatarić (2010)
 "Sve će biti dobro" as gdin. Silanović (2009)
 "Zauvijek susjedi" as Gojko (2008)
 "Hitna 94" as Martin Radić (2008)
 "Dobre namjere" as Saša (2008)
 "Ne daj se, Nina" as Ricardo Sierra (2008)
 "Ponos Ratkajevih" as James (2008)
 "A mi kis falunk" as Turkish truck driver (2017)

Theatre Roles
2007. Max Schumacher/Hiroko Tanahashi: Casting Hunger Artist, režija: Max Schumacher/Hiroko Tanahashi, Teatar ITD, Zagreb
2008. H.C. Andersen: Postojani kositreni vojnik, režija: Robert Waltl, Scena Gorica, Velika Gorica
2009. Janoch: Oh, kako je lijepa Panama, režija: Marius Schiener, Dječje kazalište Dubrava, Zagreb
2009. Ivor Martinić: Ovdje piše naslov drame o Anti, režija: Ivica Šimić, Gradsko kazalište mladih, Split
2009. Carlo Goldoni: Ribarske svađe, režija: Vinko Brešan, Splitsko ljeto
2009. Dražen Ferenčina: E, moj Pinocchio, režija: Dražen Ferenčina, Gradsko kazalište mladih, Split
2010. Petar Bosnić: Ukradena lopta, režija: Petar Bosnić, Gradsko kazalište mladih, Split
2010. Ivica Ivanac: Mačak s onoga svijeta, režija: Ladislav Vindakijević, Gradsko kazalište mladih, Split
2011. Ivan Leo Lemo: "Krčma, Alkar, Duga", režija: Ivan Leo Lemo, Gradsko kazalište mladih u Splitu
2011. Braća Grimm: Stoliću, prostri se!, režija: Nina Kleflin, Gradsko kazalište mladih, Split

References

External links
 

Living people
1984 births
Actors from Split, Croatia
Croatian male actors